Ludovia is a genus of plants first described as a genus in 1861. All the known species are native to Central and South America.

 Species
 Ludovia bierhorstii Wilder - Colombia, Ecuador
 Ludovia integrifolia (Woodson) Harling - Nicaragua, Costa Rica, Panama, Colombia, Ecuador, Peru
 Ludovia lancifolia Brongn. - Panama, Colombia, Ecuador, Peru, Venezuela, the Guianas, NW Brazil

References

Cyclanthaceae
Pandanales genera
Taxa named by Adolphe-Théodore Brongniart